Founded in 1995, the Romanian Top 100 was the national music chart of Romania. It was compiled by broadcast monitoring services Body M Production A-V (1990s and 2000s) and by Media Forest (2010s), and measured the airplay of songs on radio stations throughout the country. In 2005, the number of radio stations involved was 120. Starting in 2004, the chart was announced during a two-hour radio show which initially emerged from a partnership with teen magazine Bravo. The Romanian Top 100 was also featured in Billboard Music & Media magazine until 2003, and was—apart from a weekly Kiss FM podcast in the 2010s—announced on its own website.

Over its 17 years of existence, around 150 documented singles reached the number-one position, the first being "You Are Not Alone" by Michael Jackson in 1995. "I Follow Rivers" (2011) by Lykke Li spent 12 weeks at the summit, longer than any other song. The most successful artists were Madonna and Kylie Minogue with six documented number ones each. Multiple artists reached number one with several singles in a calendar year, including the Black Eyed Peas with "Where Is the Love?" and "Shut Up" in 2004. Cleopatra Stratan was four years old when she topped the chart in October 2006 with "Ghiță", making her the youngest artist ever to attain a number one in any country according to Guinness World Records. The Romanian Top 100 ceased publication after its last broadcast on 19 February 2012, and was replaced with the Airplay 100.

Number ones

1990s

2000s

2010s

Related number ones
The Romanian Top 100 significantly lacks chart archives for the late 2000s. At that time, Nielsen Music Control and Uniunea Producătorilor de Fonograme din România (UPFR) began publishing charts which reflected the most-broadcast songs on radio stations and television channels throughout Romania (see list of number ones below); they also gained coverage in local media. However, it is unknown whether the two were affiliated with the Romanian Top 100, and whether their rankings can be used to substitute the lacking Romanian Top 100 archives. The same applies to Media Forest, who began publishing similar radio and television airplay charts starting with July 2009. Media Forest would eventually handle compilation for the Romanian Top 100 beginning with 2011 at the latest.

Notes

References

Number-one singles
Number-one singles
Romania Singles
Lists of number-one songs in Romania